was a Japanese businessman and president of Nippon Life.

Background
Hirose was the adopted son-in-law of Suketarō Hirose; his daughter is Honorary President of Suntory.

In 1985 he received the highest distinction of the Scout Association of Japan, the Golden Pheasant Award.

References

External links

Scouting in Japan
1904 births
1996 deaths
Nippon Life